The 2018 Women's National Invitation Tournament was an annual single-elimination tournament of 64 NCAA Division I teams that were not selected to participate in the 2018 Women's NCAA tournament. The tournament committee announced the 64-team field on March 12, following the selection of the NCAA Tournament field. The tournament began on March 14 and ended on March 31, with the championship game televised on the CBS Sports Network. In the championship game, Indiana defeated Virginia Tech, 65–57.

Participants
The 2018 Postseason WNIT field consisted of 32 automatic invitations – one from each conference – and 32 at-large teams. The intention of the WNIT Selection Committee was to select the best available at-large teams in the nation. Teams with the highest finishes in their conferences’ regular-season standings that were not selected for the NCAA Tournament were offered an automatic berth. The remaining berths in the WNIT were filled by the best teams available. Teams considered for an at-large berth had overall records of .500 or better.

Automatic qualifiers

At-large bids

Bracket
All times are listed as Eastern Daylight Time (UTC−4)
* – Denotes overtime period

Semifinals and Championship Game

Semifinals

Championship

All-tournament team
 Tyra Buss (Indiana), MVP
 Amanda Cahill (Indiana)
 Taylor Emery (Virginia Tech)
 Regan Magarity (Virginia Tech)
 Teana Muldrow (West Virginia)
 Jordan Moore (TCU)

See also
 2018 Women's Basketball Invitational

References

Women's National Invitation Tournament
Women's National Invitation Tournament
Women's National Invitation Tournament
Women's National Invitation Tournament